Dimethylmercury ((CH3)2Hg), also known as Mercury dimethanide, is an extremely toxic organomercury compound. A highly volatile, reactive, flammable, and colorless liquid, dimethylmercury is one of the strongest known neurotoxins, with a quantity of less than 0.1 mL capable of inducing severe mercury poisoning resulting in death, and is easily absorbed through the skin. Dimethylmercury is capable of permeating many materials, including plastic and rubber compounds. It has been described as having a slightly sweet odor, although those who have reported its smell were exposed to harmful amounts.

Synthesis, structure, and reactions
The compound was one of the earliest organometallics reported, reflecting its considerable stability.  The compound was first prepared by George Buckton in 1857 by a reaction of methylmercury iodide with potassium cyanide:
 2 CH3HgI + 2 KCN → Hg(CH3)2 + 2 KI + (CN)2 + Hg
Later, Frankland discovered that it could be synthesized by treating sodium amalgam with methyl halides:
 Hg + 2 Na + 2 CH3I → Hg(CH3)2 + 2 NaI
It can also be obtained by alkylation of mercuric chloride with methyllithium:
 HgCl2 + 2 LiCH3 → Hg(CH3)2 + 2 LiCl
The molecule adopts a linear structure with Hg–C bond lengths of 2.083 Å.

Reactivity and physical properties
An unusual feature of this compound is its low reactivity towards proton sources, being stable in water and reacting with mineral acids at a significant rate only at elevated temperatures, whereas the corresponding organocadmium and organozinc compounds (and most metal alkyls in general) hydrolyze rapidly. The difference reflects the high electronegativity of Hg (Pauling EN = 2.00) low affinity of Hg(II) for oxygen ligands. The compound undergoes a redistribution reaction with mercuric chloride to give methylmercury chloride:
 (CH3)2Hg  +  HgCl2  →   2 CH3HgCl
Whereas dimethylmercury is a volatile liquid, methylmercury chloride is a crystalline solid.

Use
Dimethylmercury currently has few applications because of the risks involved. As with many methyl-organometallics, it is a methylating agent that can donate its methyl groups to an organic molecule; however, the development of less toxic nucleophiles such as dimethylzinc, trimethylaluminium, and Grignard reagents (organomagnesium halides), has essentially rendered this compound obsolete in organic chemistry. It was also studied for reactions involving bonding methylmercury cations to target molecules, forming potent bactericides, but methylmercury's bioaccumulation and ultimate toxicity has led it to be largely abandoned in favor of the less toxic ethylmercury and diethylmercury compounds, which perform a similar function without the bioaccumulation hazard.

In toxicology, it still finds limited use as a reference toxin. It is also used to calibrate NMR instruments for detection of mercury (δ 0 ppm for 199Hg NMR), although diethylmercury and less toxic mercury salts are now preferred.

Safety
Dimethylmercury is extremely toxic and dangerous to handle. Absorption of doses as low as 0.1 mL can result in severe mercury poisoning. The risks are enhanced because of the compound's high vapor pressure. Medicinal chemist Derek Lowe called it "deadly and hideous" in a 2013 article.

Permeation tests showed that several types of disposable latex or polyvinyl chloride gloves (typically, about 0.1 mm thick), commonly used in most laboratories and clinical settings, had high and maximal rates of permeation by dimethylmercury within 15 seconds. The American Occupational Safety and Health Administration advises handling dimethylmercury with highly resistant laminated gloves with an additional pair of abrasion-resistant gloves worn over the laminate pair, and also recommends using a face shield and working in a fume hood.

Dimethylmercury is metabolized after several days to methylmercury. Methylmercury crosses the blood–brain barrier easily, probably owing to formation of a complex with cysteine. It is not quickly eliminated from the organism, and therefore has a tendency to bioaccumulate. The symptoms of poisoning may be delayed by months, resulting in cases in which a diagnosis is ultimately discovered, but only at a point in which it is too late or almost too late for an effective treatment regimen to be successful. Methylmercury poisoning is also known as Minamata disease.

Incidents 
As early as 1865, two workers in the laboratory of Frankland died after exhibiting progressive neurological symptoms following accidental exposure to the compound. 

Karen Wetterhahn, a professor of chemistry at Dartmouth College, died in 1997, ten months after spilling only a few drops of dimethylmercury onto her latex gloves. This incident resulted in improved safety procedures for chemical-protection clothing and fume hood use.

On 15 July 2011, a German man was stabbed with an umbrella in the city of Hanover, Germany. The man, who died a year later, had managed to take the syringe from the umbrella, which was later analyzed to contain dimethylmercury; the reported cause of death was mercury poisoning.

See also
 Diethylmercury
 Mercury poisoning
 Minamata disease
 Methylmercury

References

External links
 ATSDR – ToxFAQs: Mercury
 ATSDR – Public Health Statement: Mercury
 ATSDR – MMG: Mercury
 ATSDR – Toxicological Profile: Mercury
 National Pollutant Inventory – Mercury and compounds Fact Sheet
 Chemistryworld – Death of Dr. Wetterhahn and resultant improvements in security practices

Neurotoxins
Organomercury compounds
Methyl complexes